John Kern may refer to:
John Kern (Iowa politician) (1833–1889), member of the Iowa Senate
John W. Kern (1849–1917), American Democratic politician from Indiana
John W. Kern Jr. (1900–1971), mayor of the city of Indianapolis, Indiana
John W. Kern III (1928–2018), judge of the District of Columbia Court of Appeals
John Kern (chef), Dutch Michelin starred chef of De Hooge Heerlijkheid